David H. Walsh (October 5, 1889 – June 2, 1975) was an American basketball referee.

He was born in Hoboken, New Jersey. He graduated from Hoboken High School in 1907, Montclair Teachers College (now Montclair State University) in 1911, and the Sargent School of Physical Education in 1914. 

He began officiating in 1911, starting at high schools and working his way up until he was ranked one of the top six referees in the Eastern seaboard. He also co-authored the first Manual of Basketball Officiating.

He was inducted into the Basketball Hall of Fame in 1961 as a referee.

External links 
Basketball Hall of Fame page on Walsh

1889 births
1975 deaths
Hoboken High School alumni
Sportspeople from Hoboken, New Jersey
Basketball referees
Naismith Memorial Basketball Hall of Fame inductees
Sportspeople from the New York metropolitan area
Boston University College of Health and Rehabilitation Sciences (Sargent College) alumni